In the United States an address confidentiality program allows victims of domestic violence, sexual assault, stalking or other types of crime to receive mail at a confidential address, while keeping their actual address undisclosed. This is usually done through the state's Secretary of State's address or some other address which will legally substitute the agency's address for the victim's physical address on public records.

According to the National Network to End Domestic Violence,

Address Confidentiality Programs (ACP) and Confidential Voter Listings are programs administered by the state enabling victims of domestic violence (and sometime victims of sexual assault and/or stalking) to participate in the voting process without fear of being found by their abusers. ACPs generally provide a substitute address for all public records. Confidential Voter Listings only provide confidentiality on election-related public records.

States with Confidential Address Programs

Bank accounts and address confidentiality
The rules implementing the Bank Secrecy Act require a financial institution to implement a Customer Identification Program that includes procedures that enable it to form a reasonable belief that it knows the true identity of its customers. The rules also require that a financial institution obtain a residential or business street address from each customer. Unfortunately, the substitute address under an Address Confidentiality Program does not meet the standards.

The Financial Crimes Enforcement Network issued a letter ruling to help the situation. The Financial Crimes Enforcement Network regulations also allow: "If the individual customer does not have a residential or business street address, then the rules permit the individual customer to provide a "residential or business street address of next of kin or of another contact individual."

In FIN-2009-R003, the Financial Crimes Enforcement Network found: "A customer who participates in a state-created ACP shall be treated as not having a residential or business street address and a secretary of state, or other state entity serving as a designated agent of the customer consistent with the terms of the ACP, will act as another contact individual for the purpose of complying with FinCEN's rules. Therefore, a financial institution should collect the street address of the ACP sponsoring agency for purposes of meeting its CIP address requirement."

Coronavirus disease 2019

On 23 September 2020, the Governor of California, Gavin Newsom signed executive order N-80-20 allowing local health officers and public health officials access to the state's Safe at Home program, due to their being "subject to threats and other harassment, including threats and harassment targeted at their places of residence, which threatens to chill the performance of their critical duties."

See also
 Domestic violence
 Outline of domestic violence

Notes

References

External links
 
 Financial Crimes Enforcement Network ruling FIN-2009-R003 "Customer Identification Program Rule – Address Confidentiality Programs" (PDF file), November 3, 2009

United States criminal law
Privacy
Domestic violence
Rape in the United States